Rhyme Time Town is an American children's animated musical streaming television series developed by DreamWorks Animation Television that reimagines classic nursery rhymes from the viewpoints of two preschoolers, Daisy the puppy and Cole the kitten. It was released on June 19, 2020 on Netflix. A 10-episode sing-a-long series titled Rhyme Time Town Singalongs was released on December 22, 2020.

Season 1 was released on Netflix on June 19, 2020. Season 2 was released on Netflix on June 15, 2021. The series has not yet renewed for a third season by Netflix, as it is currently on a hiatus.

Cast
 Annabelle Westenholz-Smith as Daisy & Little Lamb (Season 1) 
 Luke Amis as Cole 
 Maddie Evans as Mary Mary
 Jude Muir as Humpty Dumpty
 Louis Suc as Jack and Sled Dog #5
 Petra Joan-Athene as Jill and Sled Dog #2
 Angeli Wall as Jamie the Train
 Rachel John as Ms. MacDonald
 Katie Dalton as Lucy Goosey and Sled Dog #1
 Kate Sissons as Itsy Bitsy Spider
 Holly Hazelton as Baa Baa Black Sheep and Sled Dog #3
 Hannah Jane Fox as Mumpty Dumpty, Polly Chipmunk & Ms. Moon
 Antonio Mattera as Cosmo
 Nicolette McKenzie as Mother Goose
 Darcy Jacobs as Twinkle Star and Hayley the Comet
 Richard Frame as Mr. Sun
 Christine Allado as The Cow Who Jumps Over The Moon
 Rhashan Stone as Hickory Dickory Dock & Judge Dish
 Emma Stannard as Mrs. Chicken, Griffin/Baby Dragon, Little Lamb (Season 2) and Sled Dog #4
 Nina Wadia as Molly Chipmunk & Mayor Spoon
 Josh Whitehouse as Chuckley Bear
 Emma Williams as Mama Bunny
 Shaheen Khan as Lady Ladle
 Leonora Haig as Jenny Wren
Jessica Zerlina Leafe as Little Bo Peep
 Dan Mersh as Daddy Dragon
 Matt Mella as King's Man
 Andy Nyman as King of Hearts
 Rebecca Omgbehin as Queen of Hearts
 Daisy O'Dwyer as Princess Portia
 Ben Simpson as Max
 Ryan Sampson as Peter Piper
 Golda Rosheuvel as Castle Clock and Wing Commander of Four and Twenty Blackbirds
 Alexandra Burton as Leader Sled Dog
  Clark Devlin as Indigo

Episodes

Series Overview

Season 1 (2020)

Rhyme Time Town Singalongs (2020)

Season 2 (2021)

Music

Vol. 1

References

External links
 
 
 
 Official page on Dreamworks website

2020s American animated television series
2020s American children's television series
2020 American television series debuts
American children's animated adventure television series
American children's animated musical television series
English-language Netflix original programming
Netflix children's programming
Television series by DreamWorks Animation
Television series by Universal Television
Works based on nursery rhymes
American preschool education television series
Animated preschool education television series
2020s preschool education television series
Animated television articles needing attention
Animated television series about dogs
Animated television series about cats
Animated television series about children